Thy Neighbour's Wife (1923) was the first novel by the Irish writer Liam O'Flaherty.

External links
 The full text of Thy Neighbour's Wife at HathiTrust Digital Library

Novels by Liam O'Flaherty
1923 novels
Jonathan Cape books
Novels set in Ireland
20th-century Irish novels
1923 debut novels